(Zakari) Sakari Peltonen (born January 2, 1954 in Södertälje) is a Swedish sprint canoer who competed in the mid-1970s. He was eliminated in the semifinals of the K-4 1000 m event at the 1976 Summer Olympics in Montreal.

References
 Sports-Reference.com profile

1954 births
Living people
People from Södertälje
Canoeists at the 1976 Summer Olympics
Olympic canoeists of Sweden
Swedish male canoeists
Sportspeople from Stockholm County